Hoggicosa is a genus of wolf spiders first described by Carl Friedrich Roewer in 1960. The name is a reference to arachnologist Henry Roughton Hogg.

Species
, it contains ten species, all from Australia:

Hoggicosa alfi Langlands & Framenau, 2010
Hoggicosa bicolor (Hogg, 1906)
Hoggicosa brennani Langlands & Framenau, 2010
Hoggicosa castanea (Hogg, 1906)
Hoggicosa duracki (McKay, 1975)
Hoggicosa forresti (McKay, 1973)
Hoggicosa natashae Langlands & Framenau, 2010
Hoggicosa snelli (McKay, 1975)
Hoggicosa storri (McKay, 1973)
Hoggicosa wolodymyri Langlands & Framenau, 2010

References

Lycosidae
Araneomorphae genera
Spiders of Australia
Taxa named by Carl Friedrich Roewer